Ahmet Haxhiu (6 May 1932 – 6 July 1994) was a Kosovo Albanian political activist and one of the main gunrunners for Kosovo Liberation Army in the early 1990s. He was one of the leading figures of the Revolutionary Movement for Albanian Unification, which aimed at uniting various illegal groups who fought against the government of FR Yugoslavia. Haxhiu later joined People's Movement of Kosovo and was considered the right hand of Adem Demaçi.

On 28 November 2012 (Albanian Flag Day), Ahmet Haxhiu was awarded "The Order Hero of Kosovo" by the fourth President of the Republic of Kosovo, Atifete Jahjaga.

He was the grandfather of Kosovar politician Albulena Haxhiu.

References

1932 births
Kosovan prisoners and detainees
Yugoslav dissidents
1994 deaths
Kosovo Albanians
Politicians from Pristina
Albanian nationalists in Kosovo
Albanian rights activists
Yugoslav Albanians
Albanian separatism